Indian Trails, Inc. is an intercity bus operator primarily servicing the U.S. state of Michigan, with routes also serving Wisconsin, Minnesota, and Illinois. Indian Trails is based in Owosso, Michigan, with offices in Romulus and Kalamazoo.

History 
Indian Trails was founded in 1910 in Owosso by Wayne and Cora Taylor as the Phillips-Taylor Livery Service, whose main business was transporting cargo to and from Durand Union Station and the surrounding Shiawassee County. Beginning in the 1910s, the company expanded to include intercity offerings, becoming known as the Owosso-Flint Bus Line. and by the 1930s served much of southern Michigan. Many of its buses ran along US 12, known as "the Old Indian Trail." Reflecting this, in 1935, the company took its current name, Indian Trails.

Indian Trails offers charters, casino trips and regular fixed-route daily service. In 2006 Indian Trails assumed responsibility for a number of routes in Northern Michigan and the Upper Peninsula which Greyhound Lines had discontinued.

Indian Trails' daily scheduled bus service is part of Michigan's Intercity Bus System recognized by the Michigan Department of Transportation.

In November 2006, Indian Trails, in partnership with Okemos Travel, launched the Michigan Flyer, an express service connecting East Lansing, Jackson, and Ann Arbor with Detroit Metro Airport. In 2012, the Michigan Flyer absorbed the AirRide express service operated by TheRide, and service to Jackson was discontinued. In October 2019, a new stop was added at the Meijer store in Brighton.

On March 1, 2023, Indian Trails ended its longtime operating agreement with Greyhound Lines, and introduced a new ticketing system. The company also overhauled its route network, reintroducing direct service from Detroit to Chicago, among other changes.

Current routes

Mainline 
Effective March 1, 2023.

Michigan Flyer 

Indian Trails operates the Michigan Flyer, an express service connecting East Lansing, Brighton, and Ann Arbor with Detroit Metro Airport. The service makes nine round trips daily.

D2A2 
In partnership with the RTA of Southeast Michigan and TheRide, Indian trails also operates the D2A2, a nonstop bus service from downtown Detroit to downtown Ann Arbor. Launched in 2020, the D2A2 operates roughly every hour on weekdays, and every two hours on weekends.

See also 

 List of intercity bus stops in Wisconsin

References

External links 

Indian Trails official site
Michigan Flyer home page

Bus transportation in Michigan
Bus transportation in Wisconsin
Companies based in Michigan
Transportation in Lansing, Michigan
Transport companies established in 1910
Intercity bus companies of the United States
1910 establishments in Michigan
Transportation companies based in Michigan